Strunz & Farah is a guitar duo with an eclectic sound that has been described as a cross between world fusion and flamenco.

History
Jorge Strunz, born in Costa Rica, and Ardeshir Farah, hailing from Iran, met in the United States in 1979. Jorge Strunz was one of the founders of the Latin jazz band Caldera. Caldera combined jazz, funk and rock with a wide variety of Latin music, influenced by 1970s fusion explorers like Return to Forever and Weather Report. The four albums Caldera released did not sell, and the band called it quits in 1979 (though three out of their four albums have been reissued on CD and digital except for their third album Time & Chance).

Having both played guitar professionally since their early teens, Strunz and Iranian guitarist Ardeshir Farah soon teamed up and released their first album, Mosaico, in 1982, which was produced by Ganesh Records (of L. Subramaniam). Later they started their own label, Selva Records. They soon caught the attention of Richard Bock, an important figure in jazz radio, who helped the duo land a contract with the jazz label Milestone. As a musical duo, Strunz & Farah drew upon their collective musical influences, such as Paco de Lucía, Sabicas, Chick Corea and Persian classical music to create a unique sound that incorporates elements of Flamenco, Persian rhythms and Jazz.

Strunz & Farah have since released nineteen recordings together, several albums as a duo and collaborating with Rubén Blades (Joseph and His Brothers BMG, 1993), Luis Conté (percussion on their debut album, Mosaico) and with L. Subramaniam on two tracks ("Confluence" and "Shadow of Heaven") on their debut recording, Mosaico. Throughout their career, Strunz & Farah have collaborated with a number of other artists, combining a variety of musical traditions through their work. Past collaborators include Manoochehr Sadeghi on their second studio album, Frontera, Hayedeh on their third studio album, Guitarras, Humberto "Nengue" Hernandez on their ninth studio album, Wild Muse, and Keyavash Nourai and Diego "El Negro" Alvarez on their latest studio album, Tales of Two Guitars.

The duo also worked with Sting on the album The Living Sea: Soundtrack from the IMAX Film as session musicians.

Their latest album, Syncretic Strings, was released on March 2, 2023.

Discography

Studio albums

 Mosaico (1982)
 Frontera (1984)
 Guitarras (1985)
 Misterio (1989)
 Primal Magic (1990)
 Américas (1992)
 Heat of the Sun (1995)
 Live (1997)
 Wild Muse (1998)
 The Best of Strunz & Farah (2000)
 Stringweave (2001)
 Strunz & Farah In Performance (2003); DVD
 Rio de Colores (2003)
 Zona Tórrida (2005)
 Desert Guitars (2005)
 Jungle Guitars (2006)
 Fantaseo (2006)
 Journey Around the Sun (2011)
 Moods and Visions (2014)
 Tales of Two Guitars (2018)
 Syncretic Strings (2023)

Jorge Strunz

 Neotropical Nocturnes (2010)

As featured artists

 Sting - The Living Sea: Soundtrack from the IMAX Film (1995) (feat. Strunz & Farah); Soundtrack
 Rodrigo y Gabriela - 11:11 (2009); Track #6 (Master Maqui)

Other Compilation Appearances

Guitar Music For Small Rooms (1997) (WEA)
Gypsy Passion: New Flamenco (1997) (Narada)
Gypsy Soul: New Flamenco (1998) (Narada)
Gypsy Fire (2000) (Narada)
Guitar Greats: The Best of New Flamenco - Volume I (2000) (Baja/TSR Records)
Camino Latino / Latin Journey - Liona Maria Boyd (2002) (Moston)
The World Of The Spanish Guitar Vol. 1 (2011) (Higher Octave Music)

See also

New Flamenco
Flamenco rumba
Lara & Reyes
Shahin & Sepehr
Young & Rollins
Willie & Lobo
Johannes Linstead

References

External links
 Strunz & Farah | Official Website
 Strunz's & Farah's videos on YouTube
 Strunz & Farah on Last.fm
 
Interview on The World Music Foundation Podcast

Flamenco groups
American world music groups
Milestone Records artists
New flamenco